The 
Karasuk is a river in Novosibirsk Oblast, Russia.

The source region of the Karasuk River was declared a special protected area on 26 March 2007.

Course
At high water levels some water will flow through the river Chuman (Чуман) to the Burla (Бурла), which branches from the main river towards the south, east of the town of Karasuk. Yet more water will branches off towards the north, via the Baganyonok River branch (Russian: Баганёнок), to the Bagan River. The Karasuk has no major tributaries.

At the river's lower reaches lies the town and railway hub of Karasuk, named after the river.

See also
List of rivers of Russia

References 

Rivers of Novosibirsk Oblast
Endorheic basins of Asia